This is about a member of the Fukōzu-Matsudaira.  For others of the same name, see Matsudaira Ietada.

, also known as Tomomo no Suke was a Japanese samurai of the Sengoku period. 
He was the adoptive father of Matsudaira Tadayoshi, the fourth son of Tokugawa Ieyasu

Biography
Ietada was the fourth son of Matsudaira Koretada, who was the head of the Fukōzu branch of the Matsudaira clan. Ietada served his brother Tokugawa Ieyasu from a young age.

In 1572, he fought at the Battle of Mikatagahara. He fought in many of Ieyasu's campaigns, including against Takeda Katsuyori in the Battle of Nagashino 1575. and took part in the Siege of Takatenjin (1581) against Okabe Motonobu.

In 1590, Ietada was granted Oshi Domain (100,000 koku) in Musashi Province. He was transferred to Kashira Domain in 1592 and to Omigawa Domain in 1594.

In 1599, he was given command of Fushimi Castle near Kyoto. He was killed fighting against Ishida Mitsunari at the siege of Fushimi in 1600.

Legacy
Ietada is known for his journal, which he kept for the 17 year interval between 1575 and August 1594.

References

Daimyo
16th-century Japanese writers
Japanese diarists
Fukōzu-Matsudaira clan
1547 births
1600 deaths
Japanese warriors killed in battle
16th-century diarists